The Star Girls were an Australian pop band aimed at children. Their self-titled debut album The Star Girls from Planet Groove was nominated for the ARIA Award for Best Children's Album in 2002.

The Star Girls was formed by Dianne Regan. The band members included Dream Star (Jodie Crombie Brown), Smiley Star (Michelle Irsak), Cheeky Star (Dianne Regan) and Angel Star (Lyndal Vincent). They were sometimes joined by Regan's daughter, Jasmine, who goes by Twinkle Star.

In 2007, a spinoff animated series called "Planet Groove Featuring the Star Girls" was created for the Nicktoons Network.

Band members
Dream Star (Jodie Crombie Brown)
Smiley Star (Michelle Irsak)
Cheeky Star (Dianne Regan)
Twinkle Star (Jasmine Regan)
Angel Star (Lyndal Vincent)

Discography

Albums
The Star Girls from Planet Groove (2002)
Rock This World (2005)

Singles

Awards and nominations

ARIA Music Awards

References

External links
Archived website

The Star Girls Star Page

Australian children's musical groups
Musical groups established in 1998
Musical groups disestablished in 2007
Australian girl groups
Australian pop music groups